The Steeplechase is a three tracked racing roller coaster at Blackpool Pleasure Beach, England. It is a custom design made by Arrow Dynamics.  The ride was officially opened in 1977 by Grand National winner Red Rum, whose hoof print was also taken and is on display near the ride's exit.  It is the only operating steeplechase roller coaster left in the world. The riders sit upon a horse-shaped vehicle which can seat one or two people in line. The ride has two chain lift hills and the track winds around part of the Big Dipper and underneath part of the Nickelodeon Streak. The station is located near the Big One in the south of the park.

Gallery

External links

 Official Pleasure Beach website
 Rollercoaster database (Rollercoaster enthusiast website)

Blackpool Pleasure Beach
Roller coasters in the United Kingdom